Vše pro lásku is a 1930 silent Czech comedy film directed by Martin Frič.

Cast
 Valentin Sindler as Matej Krópal from Brochovany
 Suzanne Marwille as Vera
 Frantisek Klika as Douglas Odkolek
 Marie Behavá as Mother from Douglas
 Jan W. Speerger as Ing. Peters
 Marie Pavlíková as Krópalová (as Mána Pavlíková)
 Olga Zvachová as Olga

References

External links
 

1930 films
1930 comedy films
Czechoslovak black-and-white films
Czech silent films
Films directed by Martin Frič
Czech comedy films
1930s Czech films